P. Govindan Kutty, usually known as Govindan Kutty or Guru Govindan Kutty, was a Kathakali dancer.

References

2007 deaths
Teachers of Indian classical dance
Performers of Indian classical dance
20th-century Indian dancers
21st-century Indian dancers
Dancers from Kerala
Dancers from West Bengal